The Predasenses were a Dacian tribe.

See also
List of ancient cities in Thrace and Dacia

References

External links 

Ancient tribes in Dacia
Dacian tribes